Conchatalos samadiae is a species of sea snail, a marine gastropod mollusk, in the family Muricidae, the murex snails or rock snails.

Distribution
This species occurs in the Solomon Sea, Papua New Guinea.

References

samadiae
Gastropods described in 2016